Hunan Martyr's Park is an urban park and the largest park in Changsha, Hunan, China. It is a renowned scenic spot integrating memory, leisure and tourism. Hunan Martyr's Park has been designated as a "Provincial Key Cultural Protection Unit" by the Hunan government and a "National Patriotic Education Base" by the Publicity Department of the Communist Party of China. In 2009 it was categorized as a "National Key Park" by the Ministry of Housing and Urban-Rural Development.

History
Construction began in 1952 and completed in 1953, and opened to the public in May 1956. The Three-Arched Bridge and Yingfeng Bridge were established in 1973 and 1982 respectively. In 1983, Hunan Martyr's Park was listed as a "Provincial Key Cultural Protection Unit" by the Hunan government. The Hunan Folk Culture Village was constructed in 1992. Since May 2000 Hunan Martyr's Park open to visitors for free. It was restored in July 2007.

Climate
Hunan Martyr's Park enjoys a subtropical humid monsoon climate and exhibits four distinct seasons, with an average annual temperature of 17.21 ℃. Spring and fall are warm, while winter is chilly with cold wind. Winter temperatures average around 5 ℃. Summers are very hot and dry with a July daily average of 29 ℃.

Plant resources
There are more than 326 species of plants in the park, of which more than 150 thousand trees and 1.75 million flowering shrubs.

Parks
Hunan Martyr's Park is divided into six scenic areas, including the Martyr's Memorial, the People Leisure Park, the Water Scenery Park, the Folk Culture Village, the Adventure Playground, and the Landscape Recreation Park.

Tourist attractions

Martyr's Monument
The Martyr's Monument was built in 1959, it can be divided into upper and lower segments. The upper is a monument and the lower is a memorial hall. An inscription which was written by Mao Zedong on the monument. It reads "The Monument of Hunan Martyr's Park". There are over 90 martyrs’ portraits and the famous sayings collected from more than 100,000 Hunan martyrs in the memorial hall.

Nianjia Lake

Yingfeng Bridge

Mid-lake island
The Mid-lake islands, also known as "Xiaoyang Island", was built in 1963 with four islands, occupying  of land area.

The Ferry of Red Army
In July 1930, Peng Dehuai led the Red Three Regiments to attack Changsha in Huji Ferry of Liuyang River. After the establishment of Hunan Martyr's Park, Huji Ferry was placed under the Hunan Martyr's Park management and renamed "The Ferry of Red Army".

Transportation
 Take subway Line 3 to get off at East Martyrs Park station.

 Take bus No. 111 to the South Gate of Hunan Martyr's Park Bus Stop

References

External links
 

Parks in Hunan
Tourist attractions in Changsha
1953 establishments in China